Lolita is a 1955 novel written by Russian-American novelist Vladimir Nabokov. The novel is notable for its controversial subject: the protagonist and unreliable narrator, a middle-aged literature professor under the pseudonym Humbert Humbert, is obsessed with a 12-year-old girl, Dolores Haze, whom he kidnaps and sexually abuses after becoming her stepfather. "Lolita", the Spanish nickname for Dolores, is what he calls her privately. The novel was originally written in English and first published in Paris in 1955 by Olympia Press.

The novel has been twice adapted into film: first by Stanley Kubrick in 1962, and later by Adrian Lyne in 1997. It has also been adapted several times for the stage and has been the subject of two operas, two ballets, and an acclaimed, but commercially unsuccessful, Broadway musical. It has been included in many lists of best books, such as  Time List of the 100 Best Novels,  Le Monde 100 Books of the Century, Bokklubben World Library, Modern Library's 100 Best Novels, and The Big Read.

Plot 
The novel is prefaced by a fictitious foreword by one John Ray Jr., an editor of psychology books. Ray states that he is presenting a memoir written by a man using the pseudonym "Humbert Humbert", who had recently died of heart disease while awaiting a murder trial in jail. The memoir, which addresses the audience as his jury, begins with Humbert's birth in Paris in 1910 to an English mother and Swiss father. He spends his childhood on the French Riviera, where he falls in love with his friend Annabel Leigh. This youthful and physically unfulfilled love is interrupted by Annabel's premature death from typhus, which causes Humbert to become sexually obsessed with a specific type of girl, aged 9 to 14, whom he refers to as "nymphets".

After graduation, Humbert works as a teacher of French literature and begins editing an academic literary textbook, making passing references to repeated stays in mental institutions at this time. Before the outbreak of World War II, Humbert emigrates to America. In 1947, he moves to Ramsdale, a small town in New England, where he can calmly continue working on his book. The house that he intends to live in is destroyed in a fire. In his search for a new home, he meets the widow Charlotte Haze, who is looking for a tenant. Humbert visits Charlotte's residence out of politeness and initially intends to decline her offer. However, Charlotte leads Humbert to her garden, where her 12-year-old daughter Dolores (also variably known as Dolly, Lo, and Lola) is sunbathing. Humbert sees in Dolores the perfect nymphet, the embodiment of his old love Annabel, and quickly decides to move in.

The impassioned Humbert constantly searches for discreet forms of fulfilling his sexual urges, usually via the smallest physical contact with Dolores. When she is sent to summer camp, Humbert receives a letter from Charlotte, who confesses her love for him and gives him an ultimatum—he is to either marry her or move out immediately. Initially terrified, Humbert then begins to see the charm in the situation of being Dolores' stepfather, and so marries Charlotte for instrumental reasons. Charlotte later discovers his diary, in which she learns of his desire for her daughter and the disgust he feels towards Charlotte. Shocked and humiliated, Charlotte decides to flee and writes letters addressed to her friends warning them of Humbert. Disbelieving his false assurance that the diary is only a sketch for a future novel, Charlotte runs out of the house to send the letters but is hit and killed by a swerving car.

Humbert destroys the letters and retrieves Dolores from camp, claiming that her mother has fallen seriously ill and has been hospitalized. He then takes her to a high-end hotel that Charlotte had earlier recommended. Humbert knows he will feel guilty having sex with Dolores while she is conscious so tricks her into taking a sedative by saying it is a vitamin. As he waits for the pill to take effect, he wanders through the hotel and meets a mysterious man who seems to be aware of Humbert's plan for Dolores. Humbert excuses himself from the conversation and returns to the hotel room. There, he discovers that he had been fobbed with a milder drug, as Dolores is merely drowsy and wakes up frequently, drifting in and out of sleep. He dares not initiate sexual contact with her that night.

In the morning, Dolores reveals to Humbert that she engaged in sexual activity with an older boy at a different camp a year previously. A sexual relationship begins between the two when Lolita seduces Humbert. After leaving the hotel, Humbert reveals to Dolores that her mother is dead. The news is devastating to Lolita and she cries often in the coming days. The two travel across the country, driving all day and staying in motels. Humbert desperately tries to maintain Dolores' interest in travel—and himself, and increasingly bribes her in exchange for sexual favors. They finally settle in Beardsley, a small New England town. Humbert adopts the role of Dolores' father and enrolls her in a local private school for girls.

Humbert jealously and strictly controls all of Dolores' social gatherings and forbids her from dating and attending parties. It is only at the instigation of the school headmaster, who regards Humbert as a strict and conservative European parent, that he agrees to Dolores' participation in the school play, the title of which is the same as the hotel in which Humbert met the mysterious man. The day before the premiere of the performance, Dolores runs out of the house following an argument with Humbert. He chases after her and finds her in a nearby drug store drinking an ice cream soda. She then tells him she wants to leave town for another road trip. Humbert is initially delighted, but as they travel, he becomes increasingly suspicious. He feels that he is being followed by someone Dolores is familiar with.

The man following them is Clare Quilty—a famous playwright who wrote the play that Dolores was to participate in. In the Colorado mountains, Dolores falls ill. Humbert checks her into a local hospital, from where she is discharged one night by her "uncle". Humbert knows she has no living relatives, and he immediately embarks on a frantic search to find Dolores and her abductor, but initially fails. For the next two years, Humbert barely sustains himself in a moderately functional relationship with a young alcoholic named Rita.

Deeply depressed, Humbert unexpectedly receives a letter from a 17-year-old Dolores, telling him that she is married, pregnant, and in desperate need of money. Humbert, armed with a pistol, tracks down her address against her wishes. At Dolores' request, he pretends to be her estranged father and does not mention the details of their past relation to her husband, Richard. Dolores reveals to Humbert that Quilty took her from the hospital: she was in love with Quilty, but he rejected her when she refused to star in one of his pornographic films. Humbert claims to the reader that at this moment, he realized that he was in love with Dolores all along. Humbert implores her to leave with him, but she refuses. Accepting her decision, Humbert gives her the money she is owed from her inheritance. Humbert then goes to the drug-addled Quilty's mansion and shoots him several times.

Shortly afterward, Humbert is arrested, and in his closing thoughts, he reaffirms his love for Dolores and asks for his memoir to be withheld from public release until after her death. Dolores dies in the childbirth of her baby on Christmas Day in 1952, disappointing Humbert's prediction that "Dolly Schiller will probably survive me by many years."

Erotic motifs and controversy 
Lolita is frequently described as an "erotic novel", not only by some critics but also in a standard reference work on literature, Facts on File: Companion to the American Short Story. The Great Soviet Encyclopedia called Lolita "an experiment in combining an erotic novel with an instructive novel of manners." The same description of the novel is found in Desmond Morris's reference work The Book of Ages. A survey of books for Women's Studies courses describes it as a "tongue-in-cheek erotic novel". Books focused on the history of erotic literature such as Michael Perkins' The Secret Record: Modern Erotic Literature also so classify Lolita. More cautious classifications have included a "novel with erotic motifs" or one of "a number of works of classical erotic literature and art, and to novels that contain elements of eroticism, such as Ulysses and Lady Chatterley's Lover."

This classification has been disputed. Malcolm Bradbury writes "at first famous as an erotic novel, Lolita soon won its way as a literary one—a late modernist distillation of the whole crucial mythology." Samuel Schuman says that Nabokov "is a surrealist, linked to Gogol, Dostoyevsky, and Kafka. Lolita is characterized by irony and sarcasm; it is not an erotic novel."

Lance Olsen writes: "The first 13 chapters of the text, culminating with the oft-cited scene of Lo unwittingly stretching her legs across Humbert's excited lap ... are the only chapters suggestive of the erotic." Nabokov himself observes in the novel's afterword that a few readers were "misled [by the opening of the book] ... into assuming this was going to be a lewd book ... [expecting] the rising succession of erotic scenes; when these stopped, the readers stopped, too, and felt bored."

Style and interpretation 
The novel is narrated by Humbert, who riddles the narrative with word play and his wry observations of American culture. The novel's flamboyant style is characterized by double entendres, multilingual puns, anagrams, and coinages such as nymphet, a word that has since had a life of its own and can be found in most dictionaries, and the lesser-used "faunlet". Most writers see Humbert as an unreliable narrator and credit Nabokov's powers as an ironist. For Richard Rorty, in his interpretation of Lolita in Contingency, Irony, and Solidarity, Humbert is a "monster of incuriosity". 

Nabokov, who famously decried those he considered 'moralists', social satire, and novels with a direct political message avoided providing any overt interpretations to his work. However when prompted in a late-life interview with: "Your sense of the immorality of the relationship between Humbert Humbert and Lolita is very strong. In Hollywood and New York, however, relationships are frequent between men of forty and girls very little older than Lolita. They marry—to no particular public outrage; rather, public cooing." Replied: 

Nabokov later described Humbert as "a vain and cruel wretch who manages to appear 'touching'" in the same interview. When asked about coming up with Humbert's doubled name, he described it as "[...] a hateful name for a hateful person. It is also a kingly name, and I did need a royal vibration for Humbert the Fierce and Humbert the Humble.".

Critics have further noted that, since the novel is a first person narrative by Humbert, the novel gives very little information about what Lolita is like as a person, that in effect she has been silenced by not being the book's narrator. Nomi Tamir-Ghez writes: "Not only is Lolita's voice silenced, her point of view, the way she sees the situation and feels about it, is rarely mentioned and can be only surmised by the reader ... since it is Humbert who tells the story ... throughout most of the novel, the reader is absorbed in Humbert's feelings." Similarly Mica Howe and Sarah Appleton Aguiar write that the novel silences and objectifies Lolita. Christine Clegg notes that this is a recurring theme in criticism of the novel in the 1990s. Actor Brian Cox, who played Humbert in a 2009 one-man stage monologue based on the novel, stated that the novel is "not about Lolita as a flesh and blood entity. It's Lolita as a memory." He concluded that a stage monologue would be truer to the book than any film could possibly be. Elizabeth Janeway, writing in The New York Times Book Review, holds: "Humbert is every man who is driven by desire, wanting his Lolita so badly that it never occurs to him to consider her as a human being, or as anything but a dream-figment made flesh."

Clegg sees the novel's non-disclosure of Lolita's feelings as directly linked to the fact that her real name is Dolores and only Humbert refers to her as Lolita. Humbert also states he has effectively "solipsized" Lolita early in the novel. Eric Lemay writes:

In 2003, Iranian expatriate Azar Nafisi published the memoir Reading Lolita in Tehran about a covert women's reading group. In an NPR interview, Nafisi contrasts the sorrowful and seductive sides of Dolores/Lolita's character. She notes: "Because her name is not Lolita, her real name is Dolores which as you know in Latin means dolour, so her real name is associated with sorrow and with anguish and with innocence, while Lolita becomes a sort of light-headed, seductive, and airy name. The Lolita of our novel is both of these at the same time and in our culture here today we only associate it with one aspect of that little girl and the crassest interpretation of her." Following Nafisi's comments, the NPR interviewer, Madeleine Brand, lists as embodiments of the latter side of Lolita "the Long Island Lolita, Britney Spears, the Olsen twins, and Sue Lyon in Stanley Kubrick's Lolita."

For Nafisi, the essence of the novel is Humbert's solipsism and his erasure of Lolita's independent identity. She writes: "Lolita was given to us as Humbert's creature ... To reinvent her, Humbert must take from Lolita her own real history and replace it with his own ... Yet she does have a past. Despite Humbert's attempts to orphan Lolita by robbing her of her history, that past is still given to us in glimpses."

One of the novel's early champions, Lionel Trilling, warned in 1958 of the moral difficulty in interpreting a book with so eloquent and so self-deceived a narrator: "we find ourselves the more shocked when we realize that, in the course of reading the novel, we have come virtually to condone the violation it presents ... we have been seduced into conniving in the violation, because we have permitted our fantasies to accept what we know to be revolting."

In 1958, Dorothy Parker described the novel as "the engrossing, anguished story of a man, a man of taste and culture, who can love only little girls" and Lolita as "a dreadful little creature, selfish, hard, vulgar, and foul-tempered." In 1959, novelist Robertson Davies wrote that the theme of Lolita is "not the corruption of an innocent child by a cunning adult, but the exploitation of a weak adult by a corrupt child. This is no pretty theme, but it is one with which social workers, magistrates and psychiatrists are familiar."

In his essay on Stalinism Koba the Dread, Martin Amis proposes that Lolita is an elaborate metaphor for the totalitarianism that destroyed the Russia of Nabokov's childhood (though Nabokov states in his afterword that he "[detests] symbols and allegories"). Amis interprets it as a story of tyranny told from the point of view of the tyrant. "Nabokov, in all his fiction, writes with incomparable penetration about delusion and coercion, about cruelty and lies," he says. "Even Lolita, especially Lolita, is a study in tyranny."

The term "Lolita" has been assimilated into popular culture as a description of a young girl who is "precociously seductive ... without connotations of victimization."

Publication and reception 
Nabokov finished Lolita on 6 December 1953, five years after starting it. Because of its subject matter, Nabokov intended to publish it pseudonymously (although the anagrammatic character Vivian Darkbloom would tip off the alert reader). The manuscript was turned down, with more or less regret, by Viking, Simon & Schuster, New Directions, Farrar, Straus, and Doubleday. After these refusals and warnings, he finally resorted to publication in France. Via his translator Doussia Ergaz, it reached Maurice Girodias of Olympia Press, "three-quarters of [whose] list was pornographic trash." Underinformed about Olympia, overlooking hints of Girodias's approval of the conduct of a protagonist Girodias presumed was based on the author, and despite warnings from Morris Bishop, his friend at Cornell, Nabokov signed a contract with Olympia Press for publication of the book, to come out under his own name.

Lolita was published in September 1955, as a pair of green paperbacks "swarming with typographical errors". Although the first printing of 5,000 copies sold out, there were no substantial reviews. Eventually, at the very end of 1955, Graham Greene, in the London Sunday Times, called it one of the three best books of 1955. This statement provoked a response from the London Sunday Express, whose editor John Gordon called it "the filthiest book I have ever read" and "sheer unrestrained pornography". British Customs officers were then instructed by the Home Office to seize all copies entering the United Kingdom. In December 1956, France followed suit, and the Minister of the Interior banned Lolita; the ban lasted for two years. Its eventual British publication by Weidenfeld & Nicolson in London in 1959 was controversial enough to contribute to the end of the political career of the Conservative member of parliament Nigel Nicolson, one of the company's partners.

The novel then appeared in Danish and Dutch translations. Two editions of a Swedish translation were withdrawn at the author's request.

Despite initial trepidation, there was no official response in the U.S., and the first American edition was issued by G. P. Putnam's Sons in August 1958. The book was into a third printing within days and became the first since Gone with the Wind to sell 100,000 copies in its first three weeks. Orville Prescott, the influential book reviewer of the New York Times, greatly disliked the book, describing it as "dull, dull, dull in a pretentious, florid and archly fatuous fashion." This review failed to influence the book's sales.

Lolita was later translated into Russian by Nabokov himself and published in New York City in 1967 by Phaedra Publishers.

Present-day views 
The novel continues to generate controversy today as modern society has become increasingly aware of the lasting damage created by child sexual abuse. In 2008, an entire book was published on the best ways to teach the novel in a college classroom given that "its particular mix of narrative strategies, ornate allusive prose, and troublesome subject matter complicates its presentation to students." In this book, one author urges teachers to note that Dolores' suffering is noted in the book even if the main focus is on Humbert.

Many critics describe Humbert as a rapist, notably Azar Nafisi in her best-selling Reading Lolita in Tehran, though in a survey of critics David Larmour notes that other interpreters of the novel have been reluctant to use that term, despite its accuracy. Near the end of the novel, Humbert admits to himself, as noted in the above plot synopsis, that he has committed statutory rape, which his actions were according to the law at the time of publishing. Nabokov biographer Brian Boyd denies that it was rape "in any ordinary sense", on the grounds that "it is she who suggests that they try out the naughty trick" which she has already learned at summer camp; however, consent laws for adults cannot be applied to children. This perspective is vigorously disputed by Peter Rabinowitz in his essay "Lolita: Solipsized or Sodomized?" In 2020, a podcast hosted by Jamie Loftus set out to examine the cultural legacy of the novel, and argued that depictions and adaptations have "twisted" Nabokov's original intention of condemning Humbert in Lolita.

Sources and links

Links in Nabokov's work 
In 1928 Nabokov wrote a poem named Lilith (Лилит), depicting a sexually attractive underage girl who seduces the male protagonist just to leave him humiliated in public. In 1939 he wrote a novella, Volshebnik (Волшебник), that was published only posthumously in 1986 in English translation as The Enchanter. It bears many similarities to Lolita, but also has significant differences: it takes place in Central Europe, and the protagonist is unable to consummate his passion with his stepdaughter, leading to his suicide. The theme of hebephilia was already touched on by Nabokov in his short story "A Nursery Tale", written in 1926. Also, in the 1932 Laughter in the Dark, Margot Peters is 16 and had already had an affair when middle-aged Albinus becomes attracted to her.

In chapter three of the novel The Gift (written in Russian in 1935–37) the similar gist of Lolitas first chapter is outlined to the protagonist, Fyodor Cherdyntsev, by his landlord Shchyogolev as an idea of a novel he would write "if I only had the time": a man marries a widow only to gain access to her young daughter, who resists all his passes. Shchyogolev says it happened "in reality" to a friend of his; it is made clear to the reader that it concerns himself and his stepdaughter Zina (15 at the time of Shchyogolev's marriage to her mother) who becomes the love of Fyodor's life.

In April 1947, Nabokov wrote to Edmund Wilson: "I am writing ... a short novel about a man who liked little girls—and it's going to be called The Kingdom by the Sea." The work expanded into Lolita during the next eight years. Nabokov used the title A Kingdom by the Sea in his 1974 pseudo-autobiographical novel Look at the Harlequins! for a Lolita-like book written by the narrator who, in addition, travels with his teenage daughter Bel from motel to motel after the death of her mother; later, his fourth wife is Bel's look-alike and shares her birthday.

In Nabokov's 1962 novel Pale Fire, the titular poem by fictional John Shade mentions Hurricane Lolita coming up the American east coast in 1958, and narrator Charles Kinbote (in the commentary later in the book) notes it, questioning why anyone would have chosen an obscure Spanish nickname for a hurricane. There were no hurricanes named Lolita that year, but that is the year that Lolita the novel was published in North America.

The unfinished novel The Original of Laura, published posthumously, features the character Hubert H. Hubert, an older man preying upon then-child protagonist, Flora. Unlike those of Humbert Humbert in Lolita, Hubert's advances are unsuccessful.

Literary pastiches, allusions and prototypes 
The novel abounds in allusions to classical and modern literature. Virtually all of them have been noted in The Annotated Lolita, edited and annotated by Alfred Appel Jr. Many are references to Humbert's own favorite poet, Edgar Allan Poe.

Humbert's first love, Annabel Leigh, is named after the "maiden" in the poem "Annabel Lee" by Poe; this poem is alluded to many times in the novel, and its lines are borrowed to describe Humbert's love. A passage in chapter 11 reuses verbatim Poe's phrase ...by the side of my darling—my darling—my life and my bride. In the opening of the novel, the phrase Ladies and gentlemen of the jury, exhibit number one is what the seraphs, the misinformed, simple, noble-winged seraphs, envied, is a pastiche of two passages of the poem, the winged seraphs of heaven (line 11), and The angels, not half so happy in heaven, went envying her and me (lines 21–2). Nabokov originally intended Lolita to be called The Kingdom by the Sea, drawing on the rhyme with Annabel Lee that was used in the first verse of Poe's work. A variant of this line is reprised in the opening of chapter one, which reads ...had I not loved, one summer, an initial girl-child. In a princedom by the sea.

Humbert Humbert's double name recalls Poe's "William Wilson", a tale in which the main character is haunted by his doppelgänger, paralleling to the presence of Humbert's own doppelgänger, Clare Quilty. Humbert is not, however, his real name, but a chosen pseudonym. The theme of the doppelgänger also occurs in Nabokov's earlier novel, Despair.

Chapter 26 of Part One contains a parody of Joyce's stream of consciousness.

Humbert's field of expertise is French literature (one of his jobs is writing a series of educational works that compare French writers to English writers), and as such there are several references to French literature, including the authors Gustave Flaubert, Marcel Proust, François Rabelais, Charles Baudelaire, Prosper Mérimée, Remy Belleau, Honoré de Balzac, and Pierre de Ronsard.

Nabokov was fond of the works of Lewis Carroll, and had translated Alice in Wonderland into Russian. He even called Carroll the "first Humbert Humbert". Lolita contains a few brief allusions in the text to the Alice books, though overall Nabokov avoided direct allusions to Carroll. In her book, Tramp: The Life of Charlie Chaplin, Joyce Milton claims that a major inspiration for the novel was Charlie Chaplin's relationship with his second wife, Lita Grey, whose real name was Lillita and is often misstated as Lolita. Graham Vickers in his book Chasing Lolita: How Popular Culture Corrupted Nabokov's Little Girl All Over Again argues that the two major real-world predecessors of Humbert are Lewis Carroll and Charlie Chaplin. Although Appel's comprehensive Annotated Lolita contains no references to Charlie Chaplin, others have picked up several oblique references to Chaplin's life in Nabokov's book. Bill Delaney notes that at the end Lolita and her husband move to the fictional Alaskan town of "Gray Star" while Chaplin's The Gold Rush, set in Alaska, was originally set to star Lita Grey. Lolita's first sexual encounter was with a boy named Charlie Holmes, whom Humbert describes as "the silent ... but indefatigable Charlie." Chaplin had an artist paint Lita Grey in imitation of Joshua Reynolds's painting The Age of Innocence. When Humbert visits Lolita in a class at her school, he notes a print of the same painting in the classroom. Delaney's article notes many other parallels as well.

The foreword refers to "the monumental decision rendered December 6, 1933 by Hon. John M. Woolsey in regard to another, considerably more outspoken book"—that is, the decision in the case United States v. One Book Called Ulysses, in which Woolsey ruled that Joyce's Ulysses was not obscene and could be sold in the United States.

In chapter 29 of Part Two, Humbert comments that Lolita looks "like Botticelli's russet Venus—the same soft nose, the same blurred beauty," referencing Sandro Botticelli's depiction of Venus in, perhaps, The Birth of Venus or Venus and Mars.

In chapter 35 of Part Two, Humbert's "death sentence" on Quilty parodies the rhythm and use of anaphora in T. S. Eliot's poem Ash Wednesday.

Many other references to classical and Romantic literature abound, including references to Lord Byron's Childe Harold's Pilgrimage and to the poetry of Laurence Sterne.

Other possible real-life prototypes 
In addition to the possible prototypes of Lewis Carroll and Charlie Chaplin, Alexander Dolinin suggests that the prototype of Lolita was 11-year-old Florence Horner, kidnapped in 1948 by 50-year-old mechanic Frank La Salle, who had caught her stealing a five-cent notebook. La Salle traveled with her over various states for 21 months and is believed to have raped her. He claimed that he was an FBI agent and threatened to "turn her in" for the theft and to send her to "a place for girls like you." The Horner case was not widely reported, but Dolinin notes various similarities in events and descriptions.

While Nabokov had already used the same basic idea—that of a child molester and his victim booking into a hotel as father and daughter—in his then-unpublished 1939 work The Enchanter (Волшебник), he mentions the Horner case explicitly in Chapter 33 of Part II of Lolita: "Had I done to Dolly, perhaps, what Frank Lasalle, a fifty-year-old mechanic, had done to eleven-year-old Sally Horner in 1948?".

Heinz von Lichberg's "Lolita" 
German academic Michael Maar's book The Two Lolitas describes his discovery of a 1916 German short story titled "Lolita" whose middle-aged narrator describes travelling abroad as a student. He takes a room as a lodger and instantly becomes obsessed with the preteen girl (also named Lolita) who lives in the same house. Maar has speculated that Nabokov may have had cryptomnesia ("hidden memory") while he was composing Lolita during the 1950s. Maar says that until 1937 Nabokov lived in the same section of Berlin as the author, Heinz von Eschwege (pen name: Heinz von Lichberg), and was most likely familiar with his work, which was widely available in Germany during Nabokov's time there. The Philadelphia Inquirer, in the article "Lolita at 50: Did Nabokov take literary liberties?" says that, according to Maar, accusations of plagiarism should not apply and quotes him as saying: "Literature has always been a huge crucible in which familiar themes are continually recast... Nothing of what we admire in Lolita is already to be found in the tale; the former is in no way deducible from the latter." See also Jonathan Lethem's essay "The Ecstasy of Influence: A Plagiarism" in Harper's Magazine on this story.

Nabokov on Lolita

Afterword 
In 1956, Nabokov wrote an afterword to Lolita ("On a Book Entitled Lolita"), that first appeared in the first U.S. edition and has appeared thereafter.

One of the first things Nabokov makes a point of saying is that, despite John Ray Jr.'s claim in the Foreword, there is no moral to the story.

Nabokov adds that "the initial shiver of inspiration" for Lolita "was somehow prompted by a newspaper story about an ape in the Jardin des Plantes who, after months of coaxing by a scientist, produced the first drawing ever charcoaled by an animal: this sketch showed the bars of the poor creature's cage." Neither the article nor the drawing has been recovered.

In response to an American critic who characterized Lolita as the record of Nabokov's "love affair with the romantic novel", Nabokov writes that "the substitution of 'English language' for 'romantic novel' would make this elegant formula more correct."

Nabokov concludes the afterword with a reference to his beloved first language, which he abandoned as a writer once he moved to the United States in 1940: "My private tragedy, which cannot, and indeed should not, be anybody's concern, is that I had to abandon my natural idiom, my untrammeled, rich, and infinitely docile Russian language for a second-rate brand of English."

Estimation 
Nabokov rated the book highly. In an interview for BBC Television in 1962, he said:

Over a year later, in an interview for Playboy, he said:

In the same year, in an interview with Life, Nabokov was asked which of his writings had most pleased him. He answered:

Russian translation 
The Russian translation includes a "Postscriptum" in which Nabokov reconsiders his relationship with his native language. Referring to the afterword in the English edition, Nabokov states that only "the scientific scrupulousness led me to preserve the last paragraph of the American afterword in the Russian text..." He further explains that the "story of this translation is the story of a disappointment. Alas, that 'wonderful Russian language' which, I imagined, still awaits me somewhere, which blooms like a faithful spring behind the locked gate to which I, after so many years, still possess the key, turned out to be non-existent, and there is nothing beyond that gate, except for some burned out stumps and hopeless autumnal emptiness, and the key in my hand looks rather like a lock pick."

Adaptations 
Lolita has been adapted as two films, a musical, four stage-plays, one completed opera, and two ballets. There is also Nabokov's unfilmed (and re-edited) screenplay, an uncompleted opera based on the work, and an "imagined opera" which combines elements of opera and dance.

 Lolita was made in 1962 by Stanley Kubrick, and starred James Mason, Shelley Winters, Peter Sellers and Sue Lyon as Lolita; Nabokov was nominated for an Academy Award for his work on this film's adapted screenplay, although little of this work reached the screen; Stanley Kubrick and James Harris substantially rewrote Nabokov's script, though neither took credit. The film greatly expanded the character of Clare Quilty, and removed all references to Humbert's obsession with young girls before meeting Dolores. Veteran arranger Nelson Riddle composed the music for the film, whose soundtrack includes the hit single, "Lolita Ya Ya".
 The book was adapted into a musical in 1971 by Alan Jay Lerner and John Barry under the title Lolita, My Love. Critics praised the play for sensitively translating the story to the stage, but it nonetheless closed before it opened in New York. The show was revived in a Musicals in Mufti production at the York Theatre Company in New York in March 2019 as adapted from several of Lerner's drafts by Erik Haagensen and a score recovered and directed by Deniz Cordell.
 Nabokov's own re-edited and condensed version of the screenplay (revised December 1973) he originally submitted for Kubrick's film (before its extensive rewrite by Kubrick and Harris) was published by McGraw-Hill in 1974. One new element is that Quilty's play The Hunted Enchanter, staged at Dolores' high school, contains a scene that is an exact duplicate of a painting in the front lobby of the hotel, The Enchanted Hunters, at which Humbert begins a sexual relationship with Lolita.
 In 1981 Edward Albee adapted the book into a play, Lolita, with Nabokov (renamed "A Certain Gentleman" after a threatened lawsuit) onstage as a narrator. The troubled production was a fiasco and was savaged by Albee as well as the critics, Frank Rich even predicting fatal damage to Albee's career. Rich noted that the play's reading of the character of Quilty seemed to be taken from the Kubrick film.
 In 1992 Russian composer Rodion Shchedrin adapted Lolita into a Russian-language opera Lolita, which premiered in Swedish in 1994 at the Royal Swedish Opera. The first performance in Russian was in Moscow in 2004. The opera was nominated for Russia's Golden Mask award. Its first performance in German was on 30 April at the Hessisches Staatstheater Wiesbaden as the opening night of the Internationale Maifestspiele Wiesbaden in 2011. The German version was shortened from four hours to three, but noted Lolita's death at the conclusion, which had been omitted from the earlier longer version. It was considered well-staged but musically monotonous. In 2001, Shchedrin extracted "symphonic fragments" for orchestra from the opera score, which were published as Lolita-Serenade.
 The 1997 film Lolita was directed by Adrian Lyne, starring Jeremy Irons, Dominique Swain, Melanie Griffith, and Frank Langella.
 In 1999, the Boston-based composer John Harbison began an opera of Lolita, which he abandoned in the wake of the clergy child abuse scandal in Boston. He abandoned it by 2005, but fragments were woven into a seven-minute piece, "Darkbloom: Overture for an Imagined Opera". Vivian Darkbloom, an anagram of Vladimir Nabokov, is a character in Lolita.
 In 2003, Russian director Victor Sobchak wrote a second non-musical stage adaptation, which played at the Lion and Unicorn fringe theater in London. It drops the character of Quilty and updates the story to modern England, and includes long passages of Nabokov's prose in voiceover.
 Also in 2003, a stage adaptation of Nabokov's unused screenplay was performed in Dublin adapted by Michael West. It was described by Karina Buckley (in the Sunday Times of London) as playing more like Italian commedia dell'arte than a dark drama about paedophilia. Hiroko Mikami notes that the initial sexual encounter between Lolita and Humbert was staged in a way that left this adaptation particularly open to the charge of placing the blame for initiating the relationship on Lolita and normalizing child sexual abuse. Mikami challenged this reading of the production, noting that the ultimate devastation of events on Lolita's life is duly noted in the play.
 In 2003, Italian choreographer Davide Bombana created a ballet based on Lolita that ran 70 minutes. It used music by Dmitri Shostakovich, György Ligeti, Alfred Schnittke and Salvatore Sciarrino. It was performed by the Grand Ballet de Génève in Switzerland in November 2003. It earned him the award Premio Danza E Danza in 2004 as "Best Italian Choreographer Abroad".
 American composer Joshua Fineberg and choreographer Johanne Saunier created an "imagined opera" of Lolita. Running 70 minutes, it premiered in Montclair, New Jersey in April 2009. While other characters silently dance, Humbert narrates, often with his back to the audience as his image is projected onto video screens. Writing in The New York Times, Steve Smith noted that it stressed Humbert as a moral monster and madman, rather than as a suave seducer, and that it does nothing to "suggest sympathy" on any level of Humbert. Smith also described it as "less an opera in any conventional sense than a multimedia monodrama." The composer described Humbert as "deeply seductive but deeply evil". He expressed his desire to ignore the plot and the novel's elements of parody, and instead to put the audience "in the mind of a madman". He regarded himself as duplicating Nabokov's effect of putting something on the surface and undermining it, an effect for which he thought music was especially suited.
 In 2009 Richard Nelson created a one-man drama, the only character onstage being Humbert speaking from his jail cell. It premiered in London with Brian Cox as Humbert. Cox believes that this is truer to the spirit of the book than other stage or film adaptations, since the story is not about Lolita herself but about Humbert's flawed memories of her.
 Four Humors created and staged a Minnesota Fringe Festival version called "Four Humors Lolita: a Three-Man Show", August 2013. The show was billed as "A one hour stage play, based on the two and a half hour movie by Stanley Kubrick, based on the 5 hour screenplay by Vladimir Nabokov, based on the 300 page novel by Vladimir Nabokov, as told by 3 idiots."

Derivative literary works 
 The Italian novelist and scholar Umberto Eco published a short parody of Nabokov's novel called "Granita" in 1959. It presents the story of Umberto Umberto (Umberto being both the author's first name and the Italian form of "Humbert") and his illicit obsession with the elderly "Granita".
Jean Kerr wrote a short piece in 1959 called "Can This Romance Be Saved: Lolita and Humbert Consult a Marriage Counselor". It appears as a chapter in her second book, The Snake Has All the Lines. This is a parody in which Lolita and Humbert's story is told in the style of the Ladies' Home Journal column "Can This Marriage Be Saved?" Lolita voices her rather mundane complaints in a definite voice of her own, and the marriage counselor holds out some hope for their relationship after Humbert is released from prison at age eighty-five, by which time he may be mature enough for Lolita.
 Published in 1992, Poems for Men who Dream of Lolita by Kim Morrissey contains poems which purport to be written by Lolita herself, reflecting on the events in the story, a sort of diary in poetry form. Morrissey portrays Lolita as an innocent, wounded soul. In Lolita Unclothed, a documentary by Camille Paglia, Morrissey complains that in the novel Lolita has "no voice". Morrisey's retelling was adapted into an opera by composer Sid Rabinovitch, and performed at the New Music Festival in Winnipeg in 1993.
 Gregor von Rezzori's Ein Fremder in Lolitaland. Ein Essay ("A Stranger in Lolitaland. An Essay", 1993), first published in English by Vanity Fair.
 The 1995 novel Lo's Diary by Pia Pera retells the story from Lolita's point of view, making a few modifications to the story and names. (For example, Lolita does not die, and her last name is now "Maze".) The estate of Nabokov attempted to stop publication of the English translation (Lo's Diary), but it was protected by the court as "parody". "There are only two reasons for such a book: gossip and style," writes Richard Corliss, adding that Lo's Diary "fails both ways".
 Steve Martin wrote the short story "Lolita at Fifty", included in his collection Pure Drivel of 1999, which is a gently humorous look at how Dolores Haze's life might have turned out. She has gone through many husbands. Richard Corliss writes that: "In six pages Martin deftly sketches a woman who has known and used her allure for so long—ever since she was 11 and met Humbert Humbert—that it has become her career."
 Emily Prager states in the foreword to her novel Roger Fishbite that she wrote it mainly as a literary parody of Vladimir Nabokov's Lolita, partly as a "reply both to the book and to the icon that the character Lolita has become." Prager's novel, set in the 1990s, is narrated by the Lolita character, thirteen-year-old Lucky Lady Linderhoff.

References in media

Books 
The Bookshop (1978) is a novel by Penelope Fitzgerald, whose heroine's downfall is precipitated in part by stocking copies of Lolita.
In the novel Welcome to the N.H.K. (2002) by Tatsuhiko Takimoto, chapter 5 is titled "A Humbert Humbert for the Twenty-First Century" wherein the protagonist, Tatsuhiro Satō, becomes obsessed with online child pornography.
Reading Lolita in Tehran (2003) is a memoir about teaching government-banned Western literary classics to women in the world of an Islamic Iran, which author Azar Nafisi describes as dominated in the 1980s by fundamentalist "morality squads". Stories about the lives of her book club members are interspersed with critical commentary on Lolita and three other Western novels. Lolita in particular is dubbed the ultimate "forbidden" novel and becomes a metaphor for life in Iran. Although Nafisi states that the metaphor is not allegorical (p. 35), she does want to draw parallels between "victim and jailer" (p. 37). She implies that, like the principal character in Lolita, the regime in Iran imposes their "dream upon our reality, turning us into his figments of imagination." In both cases, the protagonist commits the "crime of solipsizing another person's life." February 2011 saw the premiere of a concert performance of an opera based on Reading Lolita in Tehran at the University of Maryland School of Music with music by doctoral student Elisabeth Mehl Greene and a libretto co-written by Iranian-American poet Mitra Motlagh. Azar Nafisi was closely involved in the development of the project and participated in an audience Q&A session after the premiere.

Film 
In "The Missing Page", one of the most popular episodes (from 1960) of the British sitcom Hancock's Half Hour, Tony Hancock has read virtually every book in the library except Lolita, which is always out on loan. He repeatedly asks if it has been returned. When it is eventually returned, there is a commotion amongst the library users who all want the book. This specific incident in the episode is discussed in a 2003 article on the decline of the use of public libraries in Britain by G. K. Peatling.
 In the movie Irma la Douce (1963), perky Parisian streetwalker Irma has a co-worker named Lolita, who is middle-aged.
 In the movie Jab Jab Phool Khile (1965), Rita Khanna (Nanda) reads Lolita in the houseboat at the time of teaching Hindi to Raja (Shashi Kapoor).
 In the Woody Allen film Manhattan (1979), when Mary (Diane Keaton) discovers Isaac Davis (Allen) is dating a 17-year-old (Mariel Hemingway), she says, "Somewhere Nabokov is smiling." Alan A. Stone speculates that Lolita had inspired Manhattan. Graham Vickers describes the female lead in Allen's movie as "a Lolita that is allowed to express her own point of view" and emerges from the relationship "graceful, generous, and optimistic".
 Tracy Lemaster sees many parallels between Lolita and the 1999 film American Beauty, including their references to rose petals and sports, arguing that Beauty'''s cheerleading scene is directly derived from the tennis scene in Lolita.
 In the Jim Jarmusch film Broken Flowers, Bill Murray's character comes across an overtly sexualized girl named Lolita. Although Murray's character says it is an "interesting choice of name", Roger Ebert notes that "Neither daughter nor mother seems to know that the name Lolita has literary associations."

 Popular music 
 "Moi... Lolita" (English: "Me... Lolita") is the debut single of the French singer Alizée, which was released on her debut album Gourmandises (2000) when she was 15.
 Spanish-born Mexican singer Belinda Peregrín made a song for her third studio album Carpe Diem titled "Lolita" inspired by the book. She made a reference saying "sin duda Nabokov, fue el que me escribio pero en realidad fui yo que lo invento" (English: "without a doubt Nabokov, was the one who wrote about me but in reality I'm the one who invented it").
In The Police song "Don't Stand So Close to Me", about a schoolgirl's crush on her teacher, the final verse states, "It's no use, he sees her/ he starts to shake and cough / just like the old man in / that book by Nabokov."
In the title song of her mainstream debut album, One of the Boys, Katy Perry says that she "studied Lolita religiously", and the cover-shot of the album references Lolita's appearance in the earlier Stanley Kubrick film. She identifies with the character, named a guitar of hers "Lolita", and had her fashion sense at a young age influenced by Swain's outfits in the later Adrian Lynne film. Charles A. Hohman from PopMatters noted that one summer, the tomboy lifestyle just didn't hold her interest, so she started 'studying Lolita religiously' and noticing guys noticing her.Rolling Stone has noted that Lana Del Rey's 2012 album Born to Die has "loads of Lolita references", and it has a bonus track entitled "Lolita". She has herself described the album's persona to a reviewer from The New Yorker as a combination of a "gangster Nancy Sinatra" and "Lolita lost in the hood". The reviewer notes that "her invocations of Sinatra and Lolita are entirely appropriate to the sumptuous backing tracks" and that one of the album's singles, "Off to the Races", repeatedly quotes from the novel's opening sentence: "light of my life, fire of my loins".

 See also 
 Le Monde 100 Books of the Century
 Lolicon

 References 

 Cited sources 
  One of the best guides to the complexities of Lolita. First published by McGraw-Hill in 1970. (Nabokov was able to comment on Appel's earliest annotations, creating a situation that Appel described as being like John Shade revising Charles Kinbote's comments on Shade's poem Pale Fire. Oddly enough, this is exactly the situation Nabokov scholar Brian Boyd proposed to resolve the literary complexities of Nabokov's Pale Fire.)
 

 Further reading 
  A pioneering study of Nabokov's interest in and literary uses of film imagery.
  Essays on the life and novels.
  The major study of Nabokov's lepidoptery, frequently mentioning Lolita.
  An introduction and study-guide in PDF format.
 The original novel.
 A modern study of all Nabokov's novels, in Russian and English.
  A widely praised monograph dealing extensively with Lolita.

 Audiobooks 
 2005: Lolita'' (read by Jeremy Irons), Random House Audio,

External links 

 Cover images of various editions
 Lolita USA – The itineraries of Humbert's and Lolita's two voyages across the U.S.A. 1947–1949, with maps and pictures.
 Lolita Calendar – A detailed and referenced inner chronology of Nabokov's novel.
 Lolita Podcast - A 10-episode podcast about the novel, films and information about Lolita in pop-culture.

1955 American novels
Black comedy books
American erotic novels
Fiction with unreliable narrators
Incest in fiction
Metafictional novels
Obscenity controversies in literature
American novels adapted into films
Russian novels adapted into films
Novels by Vladimir Nabokov
Postmodern novels
Sexuality and age in fiction
Novels about writers
Novels about orphans
Pedophilia in literature
Olympia Press books
American novels adapted into plays
Novels adapted into ballets
Novels adapted into operas
Novels about rape
Novels about child sexual abuse
Novels set in the 1940s
Novels set in the 1950s
Novels set in New England
Russian magic realism novels
Censored books
Hebephilia in literature